Franklin Michael "Frank" Simek (born October 13, 1984) is an American former soccer player.

Playing career
Born in St. Louis, Missouri, Simek played soccer as a child in the United States but did not think of the game as a career until his family moved to London after his father was assigned to a position at the English office of Anheuser-Busch when Frank was 12. He was signed by Arsenal to a development contract, but decided to move back to St. Louis, where he played at Saint Louis University High School, as well as Metro F.C. with teammates (Chris Loftus, Nathan Sabich, Eric Joseph and Adam Lanter.), Then under the direction of Dave Fernandez and Dale Schilly. However, during this time Arsenal called him back to play on the youth team.

While at Arsenal he rose to assume the captaincy of the reserve side, but had difficulty breaking into the first team; he found himself behind Lauren, Kolo Touré, Emmanuel Eboué and Justin Hoyte in the pecking order. He played a single match for Arsenal, in the League Cup against Wolverhampton Wanderers on December 2, 2003.

Sheffield Wednesday
Simek joined the Owls on a free transfer from Arsenal in the summer of 2005 and made his Sheffield Wednesday debut on the opening day of the 2005–06 season away at Stoke City. He went on to win a regular starting spot, ousting fan-favourite Lee Bullen from his preferred right-back position. Simek scored his first goal in his first season at Wednesday away at Millwall. The goal gave the Owls a 1–0 win and helped them in their battle against relegation. Simek then managed to get his first home goal against Colchester in the 2006–2007. Simek had managed to gain a regular first team place at Hillsborough became a crowd favourite for his tough tackling and powerful running.

Simek signed a new contract with Sheffield Wednesday on 26 July 2007.  The contract will see him remain at Hillsborough until 2010.

Simek suffered a serious ankle injury playing against Crystal Palace in December 2007. The injury kept him out of the Wednesday first team for over ten months. He made a slow return with a number of reserve team appearances followed by an appearance on the substitutes bench against Birmingham City on 25 October 2008, and then finally a return to first team football three days later when he came on as a substitute against Plymouth.

Carlisle United
Simek signed for Carlisle United on a 2-year contract and joined the squad on 1 July 2010. Since then he has been an ever-present in the United team, apart from the start of the 2011–12 season in which he suffered an injury that left him out of action for 5 months. Replacements such as James Tavernier and Christian Ribeiro filled the right-back position in Simek's absence but upon his recovery he instantly earned his place in the Carlisle team yet again.  In July 2012, Simek signed a new one-year deal with Carlisle United, keeping him at the club until the summer of 2013.

Honors

United States
CONCACAF Gold Cup Champions (1): 2007

Carlisle United
Football League Trophy winner (1): 2011

References

External links

1984 births
Living people
Soccer players from Missouri
American soccer players
American expatriate soccer players
American expatriate sportspeople in England
CONCACAF Gold Cup-winning players
Arsenal F.C. players
Queens Park Rangers F.C. players
English Football League players
AFC Bournemouth players
Sheffield Wednesday F.C. players
Carlisle United F.C. players
United States men's under-20 international soccer players
United States men's international soccer players
2007 CONCACAF Gold Cup players
Association football defenders
American people of Czech descent
Expatriate footballers in England